Cellufun, also known as Tylted, is a social gaming community accessible from any mobile device, from the latest smartphones and tablets to the smallest feature phones.  Cellufun is different from most other social networks, as it is anonymous, with users creating avatars to represent themselves.  This has resulted in Cellufun ranking #117 in the Inc. 500 list of fastest-growing companies. By blending chat and a large catalog of social games, and as verified by comScore, Te has the highest user engagement numbers of any mobile internet site.

Cellufun partners with mobile operators, mobile device makers, and media companies such as AT&T Mobility, Verizon Wireless, MetroPCS, Virgin Mobile, RIM, AOL, and USA Today to deliver branded entertainment and marketing.

History 
In February 2013, six years after the company's original venture financing round the Cellufun website and the Cellufun and Tylted brands were reacquired  by two of its founders, Steve Dacek and Arthur Goikhman, who are operating the website under the Cellufun brand.

Based on Wall Street in New York City, the company was founded in 2005 by Cary Torkelson, Arthur Goikhman and Stephen Dacek.  For several years, the company relied on advertising as its sole source of revenue. In mid-2009, Tylted added a new revenue stream by introducing a premium virtual currency called "FunCoins" to complement the existing "earned" point system called Cellupoints. While all of Cellufun's games and applications remained free to play, the introduction of FunCoins opened up some premium content such as unique avatar clothes and special in-game advantages to those who wished to purchase the new currency. Cellufun's community, as of July 2009 consisted of over 2 million registered users.

In 2010, Cellufun was recognised as one of Top 8 mobile websites.

In addition to casino games, board games and traditional social titles like Special Ops, MOBile Wars, Farm World, Mobile Chef and Pocket Beanie Babies, Tylted also produces games based on current news and events. "Made-off" was based upon the Bernard Madoff Ponzi scheme.  Gulf Rescue raised awareness about the devastating oil spill into the Gulf of Mexico, and a percentage of all virtual goods revenues were donated to the Greater New Orleans Foundation. Some of the chat sections are used for other things such as role-play.

Awards 
On January 28, 2008, Cellufun's The Mobile Ring was awarded 2008 Best Mobile Game at NAPTE Mobile++ Top 12. Then, on February 14, Cellufun scored at the highest level of the Mobile Industry by being awarded a joint win in the "Best Mobile Game" category at the Global Mobile Awards 2008, held at the Mobile World Congress in Barcelona. Cellufun won for the multiplayer WAP game, Call of the Pharaoh, where players must work together to build a pyramid.

References

External links 
 Techcrunch
 DigitalMediaNet.com

American social networking websites
Mobile game companies
Video game development companies
Video game companies of the United States
Companies based in New York City
Companies established in 2005